Raj Mangal Singh Chaudhary is an Indian actor, screenwriter and film director.

Early life and career
Chaudhary was born in Darjeeling, India. After pursuing a career in modelling and earning his degree in software engineering from BMS College of Engineering, he opened his own company in Bangalore. When Chaudhary was defrauded by his business partners he took an opportunity to move to Mumbai in order pursue a new career in acting. Chaudhary was inspired to write his own script after seeing the film Satya with its script written by Anurag Kashyap. Drawing on experiences from his college days, he worked on his script which focused on the practice of ragging, the physical and mental abuse of students in educational institutions. After the film in which he was supposed to appear fell through, Chaudhary took his script to director Kashyap who became his mentor. Kashyap wrote a new screenplay based on Chaudhary's original script for what would eventually become the film Gulaal. In addition to his work on Gulaal, Chaudhury also assisted on the set of Black Friday while playing a minor role and wrote the short story on which No Smoking is based. He appeared in the 2003 film Kuch Naa Kaho which starred Aishwarya Rai and Abhishek Bachchan. He next appeared in Sushil Rajpal's film Antardwand which won the 2007 National Film Award for Best Film on Social Issues and was released in 2010; his upcoming project is the Irffan Khan, Abhay Deol starrer Karmaya.

Filmography

Acting credits

References

External links
 

Indian male film actors
Living people
People from Darjeeling
Male actors in Hindi cinema
1975 births